Patience is the third album by punk rock quartet Mannequin Pussy, released in June 2019 by Epitaph Records.

It was produced by Will Yip, who has worked alongside musicians and bands like Code Orange, Turnover and more.

Critical reception

Patience was released to critical acclaim. On Metacritic, it holds a score of 85 out of 100, indicating "universal acclaim", based on eight reviews. 

Quinn Moreland of Pitchfork gave the record a glowing assessment, calling it "one of the best punk rock records" of 2019.

Accolades

Year-end lists

Track listing
All words by Marisa Dabice. All songs by Mannequin Pussy.

Personnel
Mannequin Pussy
 Marisa Dabice – vocals, guitar
 Athanasios Paul – guitar, keys
 Colins Rey Regisford – bass, samples, vocals
 Kaleen Reading – drums, percussion

References 

2019 albums
Punk rock albums by American artists